Miramar Beach is a census-designated place (CDP) in Walton County, Florida, United States. The population was 6,146 at the 2010 census. Miramar Beach is due east of Destin, Florida. It is often considered to be part of the city of Destin. However, it has its own ZIP code (32550) and is in Walton County, whereas Destin is in Okaloosa County.

Geography
Miramar Beach is located in the southwestern corner of Walton County at  (30.382698, -86.355962).

The CDP is located along the Gulf Coast. U.S. Route 98 is the main route through the CDP, and leads east 47 mi (76 km) to Panama City and west 9 mi (14 km) to Destin.

Demographics

As of the 2020 census, Miramar Beach had a population of 8,002 people with 4,334 households. There were 2.06 persons per household. There was a population of 1,139.6 per square mile. 

3.1% of the population were under 5 years old, 13.5% were under 18 years old, and 34.1% were 65 years or older. 89.0% of the population were white, 5.5% were black or African American, 0.4% were American Indian or Alaska Native, 0.5% were Asian, 4.4% were two or more races, and 6.0% were Hispanic or Latino.  52.0% were female and 11.4% of the population were foreign born persons.There were 875 veterans living in the city. 

The median value of owner-occupied housing units was $434,300. The median selected monthly owner costs with a mortgage was $2,322 and $791 for owners without a mortgage. The median gross rent was $1,565. 98.8% of the households had a computer and 90.4% had a broadband internet subscription. The median household income was $75,347. The per capita income was $56,876. 5.4% of the population lived below the poverty threshold.

98.4% of the population 25 years and older had a highschool diploma. 53.6% of the population 25 years and older had a Bachelor’s degree or higher.

Notable residents
 Ross Kenseth, former racing driver

References

Census-designated places in Walton County, Florida
Census-designated places in Florida
Populated coastal places in Florida on the Gulf of Mexico
Beaches of Walton County, Florida
Beaches of Florida